| goals               = 53
| top goal scorer     =  Raúl Ruidíaz(4 goals)
| prevseason          = 2018
| nextseason          = 2020
}}

The 2019 MLS Cup Playoffs (branded as the 2019 Audi MLS Cup Playoffs for sponsorship reasons) was the post-season championship of Major League Soccer (MLS), the top soccer league in the United States and Canada. It was the 24th edition of the MLS Cup Playoffs, the tournament culminating at the end of the 2019 regular season. The playoffs began on October 19, 2019, and concluded with MLS Cup 2019 on November 10.

The playoffs were contested by fourteen teams under a new format, with the top seven teams from both conferences qualifying based on their regular season performances. All rounds used single-elimination matches that were hosted by the higher remaining seed, and no rounds would be re-seeded unlike previous years. The first round (October 19–20) featured the second through seventh-seeded teams in each conference playing each other, with the first-placed teams in each conference receiving a bye. The winners of the first round advanced to the Conference Semifinals (October 23–24) along with the first-placed team from each conference. The winners of the Conference Semifinals then advanced to the Conference Finals (October 29–30) for an MLS Cup berth.

Atlanta United FC were the defending MLS Cup champions, having won their first title in MLS Cup 2018, but were eliminated by Toronto FC in the Conference Finals. The 2019 regular season Supporters' Shield champions were Los Angeles FC, but they were also eliminated in the Conference Finals by Seattle Sounders FC. For the first time in league history, the four conference finalists were all expansion teams and did not feature any of the ten original teams from the inaugural season. Seattle hosted MLS Cup 2019 and won 3–1 in their third finals played against Toronto FC.

Qualified teams

Eastern Conference
Atlanta United FC
D.C. United
New England Revolution
New York City FC
New York Red Bulls
Philadelphia Union
Toronto FC

Western Conference
FC Dallas
LA Galaxy
Los Angeles FC
Minnesota United FC
Portland Timbers
Real Salt Lake
Seattle Sounders FC

Conference standings
The top seven teams from each conference advanced to the MLS Cup Playoffs, with the top team in each conference receiving a first-round bye. Background colors denote playoff teams, with green also qualifying for the 2020 CONCACAF Champions League, and blue also qualifying for the 2020 Leagues Cup. Non-playoff Montreal Impact qualified for the 2020 CONCACAF Champions League as winners of the 2019 Canadian Championship.

Eastern Conference

Western Conference

Bracket

Results

First round

Eastern Conference

In the opening match of the playoffs, defending champions Atlanta United FC hosted the New England Revolution in a rematch of the final regular season match they played two weeks prior. The match was scoreless through the first half and after half-time until a formation change and substitutions by Atlanta manager Frank de Boer allowed the hosts to score. Defender Franco Escobar finished a through ball from Ezequiel Barco with a one-time shot in the 70th minute, which gave Atlanta the 1–0 victory.

Fourth-seeded Toronto FC hosted the fifth seed, D.C. United, at BMO Field in the second Eastern Conference playoffs match. Toronto took a lead in the first half through a goalkeeping error by Bill Hamid that resulted in a successful chance for Marky Delgado, but D.C. equalized in second half stoppage time with a sequence on a Wayne Rooney corner kick that ended with a goal for Lucas Rodríguez. Toronto scored four unanswered goals in extra time, advancing with a 5–1 victory, with two goals from Jonathan Osorio and one apiece from Richie Laryea and Nick DeLeon.

The Philadelphia Union hosted the New York Red Bulls on the following day and fell behind with a 3–1 halftime lead for the visitors, who took advantage of mistakes by goalkeeper Andre Blake. The Union responded with two unanswered goals in the second half to tie the match at full time. In first half stoppage time during extra time, substitute Marco Fabián scored from a chipped shot that gave the Union a 4–3 win, their first playoffs victory.

Western Conference

Conference Semifinals

Eastern Conference

Western Conference

Conference Finals

Eastern Conference

Western Conference

MLS Cup 2019

Top goalscorers
There were 53 goals scored in 13 matches, with an average of 4.08 goals per match.

Notes

References

2019 Major League Soccer season
MLS Cup Playoffs
MLS Cup Playoffs
MLS Cup Playoffs
MLS Cup Playoffs